Seval is a 2008 Indian Tamil-language period romance action film written and directed by Hari and produced  by M. A. Jinnah. It stars Bharath, Poonam Bajwa, Simran, and Vadivelu, while Sampath Raj, Prem, Y. G. Mahendran, Rajesh, Yuvasri, and Shanmugarajan play supporting roles. The music was composed by G. V. Prakash Kumar with cinematography by Priyan and editing by V. T. Vijayan. The film released on 27 October 2008.

Plot
The film begins with Murugesan being released from the Central Jail, Palayamkottai. Murugesan has been incarcerated for 17 years. The story rewinds to 1989 when he was an unruly youngster in Sivasailam village near Tenkasi. His parents are flower-sellers.

Life is a long, sunny adventure for Murugesan who beats people up, sells his grandfather's land, runs over rooftops (like the rooster of the title) and incurs so much of his father's wrath that he is prophesied to meet a horrible end – not that this gloomy prospect affects Murugesan. He continues on his own sweet way until he runs smack into Parijatham, a demure, fair-complexioned, striking Iyer girl, the daughter of Panjami Iyer and the younger sister of Gayatri.

In the meantime, the village's bigwig Periyavar, who is magnanimous in public and a tyrant at home, casts his eyes on Parijatham. What sets his characterization apart is that he is not your average villain who shrieks and carries away the heroine; he places his pawns carefully and is afraid of being found out. Periyavar and Murugesan come close to fighting times but the situations defuse themselves in a perfectly natural fashion.

Several twists in the tale occur and Murugesan and Parijatham are bound in a net from which, seemingly, there is no escape.

Cast

Soundtrack
The songs were composed by G. V. Prakash.

Release
The satellite rights of the film were sold to Kalaignar TV. It was premiered in television on 25 December 2009 coinciding Christmas festival and "Velli Parisu".

Critical reception
Sify wrote, "The film just drives you crazy, and story telling itself is confusing with a lot of plot holes. At times it is hard to tell what the film is about, though it is very predictable at every turn as Hari has taken certain scenes and situations from his earlier films!". Behindwoods wrote, "Looking at Seval, one does not know whether Hari has tried to be different or is it the execution that went wrong. Clearly, this was made by a really ‘out of form’ Hari who generally delivers great results."

References

External links
 

2008 films
2000s masala films
2000s Tamil-language films
Films directed by Hari (director)
Films scored by G. V. Prakash Kumar
Indian action drama films
2000s action drama films